Cutter John is a fictional character in the 1980s comic strip Bloom County by Berke Breathed.

Cutter, a Vietnam War veteran using a wheelchair due to paraplegia from a war injury, was one of the county's most well-liked citizens. Despite being somewhat childish and awkward at times, he was very popular with the ladies, particularly schoolteacher Bobbi Harlow. His aging mother, who visited on December 9, 1982, still called him 'Pumpkin'.  Cutter also was a good friend to many of the animal characters of Bloom County, often role-playing Star Trek with them (using his wheelchair as the "Enterpoop"): in the reboot, they engage in Star Wars roleplay (aboard the recumbently configured Aluminum Falcon).

Cutter claims he was injured outside Quảng Trị in 1969, in a booby-trapped tunnel.  He says that three of his buddies risked their lives to save him. Because he was inside a tunnel, he probably was a tunnel rat during the war.

In one story arc, he and Opus the Penguin were lost at sea (after Oliver Wendell Jones had converted Cutter's wheelchair into a helium balloon) while attempting to cause havoc at the South African embassy in Washington, D.C. (their goal was to turn the South African ambassador black).

Having blown off course and crashed into the Atlantic Ocean, Cutter was captured by a Soviet submarine and held as a spy. Opus developed amnesia during the incident and found his way back to the Bloom Boardinghouse, and told everyone what had happened once his memory returned. Eventually Cutter was traded for Bill the Cat, who had apparently been moonlighting as a spy. He appeared much less often after that. In one Sunday strip, it is revealed that "Cutter John's" true name is Cutter Jeff. He prefers to be called Cutter John, though.

Cutter John is one of Breathed's oldest characters, first appearing in The Academia Waltz. (In those days his name was given as "Saigon John" and his war injury is described as taking a shot (presumably friendly fire) while smoking a bong (improvised from his M16) with a North Vietnamese soldier, making his tunnel rat story presumably a retcon.) His more familiar name is most likely a reference to Trapper John McIntyre from M*A*S*H.  While a major character in the first half of Bloom County 's nine-year run, his role was reduced to only occasional cameos for the remainder of that strip and its immediate spin-off, Outland.  In the commentary in one of the Bloom County collections, Breathed observed that he dropped Cutter John from the strip because it was too artistically challenging and "frustrating" to draw someone sitting down in every panel of the comic. According to Breathed, a wheelchair-using fan of the strip, upon hearing this observation, said Breathed "ought to try sitting in a wheelchair [himself] for real frustration". In the revival Bloom County strips, Cutter John has been seen standing with the aid of forearm crutches.

His sole appearance in Breathed's last strip, Opus, comes in a one-panel cameo, alongside Bill the Cat, Michael Binkley, Milo Bloom, and Oliver Wendell Jones,  when Steve Dallas "flashes back" and sees them shortly before going to see Opus in the Animal Shelter in the strip's final storyline. This makes Cutter the second character (after Dallas) to appear in all four of Breathed's comics.

He returns in the 2015 Bloom County revival, where after accidentally running her over during one of his pop culture mash-up fantasies, begins dating Cozy Fillerup, who lives in the Bloom Boarding House.

References

Bloom County characters
Comics characters introduced in 1981
Fictional characters with paraplegia
Fictional Vietnam War veterans